Kenneth Holland may refer to:

 Kenneth Lamar Holland (1934–2021), former U.S. Representative from South Carolina
 Kenneth Holland (cricketer) (1911–1986), English cricketer